Sławek Jaskułke (born 2 January 1979) is a Polish pianist, composer and bandleader. He is also an arranger, record producer, and a member of Zbigniew Namysłowski Quintet. He has composed piano, orchestra, theatre, and film music.

Career
Jaskułke has performed at Carnegie Hall in New York City, Symphony Hall in Chicago, Munich Philharmonic, and the Moscow International Performing Arts Center, the  North Sea Jazz Festival, Berlin Jazz Fest, Red Sea Jazz Festival, Padova Jazz Festival, Garana International Jazz Festival, and the Jazz Jamboree. He has performed in dozens of countries around the world and on almost all continents. In 2006 he represented Poland at the Music Beyond Borders Festival in Hong Kong, which resulted with recording an album Jaskułke – Hong Kong. In September 2010 he appeared at the World Expo in Shanghai, presenting a premiere of Jaskułke – Chopin for Five Pianos.

He has worked with Petr Cancura, Furio di Castri, Krzesimir Dębski, Urszula Dudziak, David Fiuczynski, L.U.C, Janusz Muniak, David Murray, Adam Pierończyk, Tomasz Szukalski, Tymon Tymanski, Michał Urbaniak, and Eric Vloeimans.

Among his most important awards are: Pegaz – Polish TV award for musical achievements,  Jazz Oscar of Music Lovers Association in Łódź, he was a nominee for Fryderyk – Polish Phonographic Industry Award for Jazz Musician of the Year and Jazz Album of the Year for Jaskułke - Fill the Harmony Philharmonics  with Cameral Orchestra Hanseatica.

Discography
 Sławek Jaskułke, Moments
 Jaskułke & Wyleżoł, DuoDram
 Sławek Jaskułke, Hong Kong
 Jaskułke & Hanseatica Chamber Orchestra, Fill The Harmony Philharmonics
 Sławek Jaskułke, 3yo, Sugarfree
 Sławek Jaskułke, Live from Gdynia Summer Jazz Days 2001
 Zbigniew Namysłowski, Nice & Easy
 Zbigniew Namysłowski, Assymetry
 Zbigniew Namysłowski, Standards
 Przemek Dyakowski, Melisa
 Wojtek Staroniewicz, Alternations
 Jacek Kochan, Yearning
 Jacek Kochan, Double life of a chair
 Jerzy Małek, Bop beat
 Pink Freud, Sorry Music Polska
 Pink Freud, Jazz fajny jest (remix & live)
 Sowiński & The Collective, llustrations
 Emil Kowalski Plaing Benny Goodman
 Piotr Zastróżny Album. Live in studio
 Cezary Paciorek, Shalom
 Novika, Tricks of life Waldek Chyliński, Słowa Bassisters Orchestra, 2002 Psalmy - Artyści polscy Janowi Pawłowi II w hołdzie

References

External links

Free improvisation pianists
1979 births
Living people
Polish jazz pianists
21st-century pianists